This is a list of places on the Victorian Heritage Register in the City of Whittlesea in Victoria, Australia. The Victorian Heritage Register is maintained by the Heritage Council of Victoria.

The Victorian Heritage Register, as of 2020, lists the following 14 state-registered places within the City of Whittlesea:

References

Whittlesea
City of Whittlesea